Ahmadun Yosi Herfanda (born January 17, 1958, in Kaliwungu, Kendal, Central Java, Indonesia), is an Indonesian journalist and poet. His name is also written as Ahmadun YH, Ahmadun Y. Herfanda, Ahmadun Herfanda, or AYH (ayeha). Ahmadun's poetry focuses on social and religious themes and is informed by Sufism. He is a reporter and arts editor at the daily newspaper Republika. Now he is known as a famous Indonesian poet and writer.

Education
Ahmadun received a Master of Arts in Literary at Yogyakarta National University, in 1986. In 2002–2005, he studied information technology at Paramadina Mulia University, Jakarta.

Career

Ahmadun has written poems, short stories, essays, and a novel. He has been published in newspapers, magazines and journals, and his work has been read on radio, television, and web sites: Horison, Kompas, Republika, Sinar Harapan, Suara Pembaruan, Basis, Ulumul Qur'an, Bahana (Brunei Darussalam), Indosiar (television, Indonesia), Deutsche Welle (radio, Germany), the journal Indonesia and the Malay World (London), Mastera, Poetry.com (USA), and Cybersastra.com. He often reads his poetry at many art events in Malaysia, Brunei Darussalam, Egypt, South Korea, United States of America, Singapore, and Indonesia. He also often invited to be speaker at national and international art forums (art events) in Indonesia, Malaysia, the United States and Egypt.

Ahmadun has been invited to be a juror at numerous literary arts contests and festivals.

Organizations
Ahmadun has been active in many arts organizations:
 Komunitas Sastra Indonesia (KSI—The Indonesia Literary Community, founder and chairman, 1999–2002, 2008–2010)
 Masyarakat Sastra Jakarta (MSJ—The Jakarta Literary Society, founder and consultant)
 Himpunan Sarjana Kesastraan Indonesia (HISKI – The Indonesia Literary Academician Association, chairman, 1992–1994)
 Forum Lingkar Pena (FLP – Pen Circle Forum, consultant, 1997–2005)
 Komunitas Cerpen Indonesia (KCI - The Indonesia Short Story Community—founder and chairman, 2007–2010)

Now, his primary job is as a journalist and arts editor at the daily newspaper, Republika.

Bibliography
 Ladang Hijau (The Green Fields, poetry collection, 1980)
 Sang Matahari (The Sun, poetry collection, 1984)
 Sajak Penari (The Dancer Verses, poetry collection, 1991)
 Fragmen-Fragmen Kekalahan (Losing Fragments, poetry collection, Angkasa, Bandung, 1996)
 Sembahyang Rumputan (The Worshipping Grass, poetry collection, Bentang Budaya,Yogyakarta, 1996)
 Sebelum Tertawa Dilarang (Before Laughter was Banned, short story collection, Balai Pustaka, Jakarta, 1996)
 Dialektika Sastra, Tasawuf dan Alquran (The Quran, Sufism and Literary Dialectic, book manuscript, 1986–2002)
 Koridor yang Terbelah (The Corridor Cracked, essay collection, book manuscript, 2002)
 Ciuman Pertama untuk Tuhan (The First Kissing for God, poems collection, bilingual, 2003)
 Sebutir Kepala dan Seekor Kucing (A Head and A Cat, short story collection, Bening Publishing, Jakarta, 2004)
 The Worshipping Grass (poetry collection, bilingual, Bening Publishing, Jakarta, 2005)
 Badai Laut Biru (The Blue Sea Storm, short story collection, Senayan Abadi Publishing, Jakarta, 2004).
 "Kolusi" ("Power Scandal", short story, 2006).

Anthologies 
 Many of his poems and short stories were collected in Tonggak 4 (poetry, Linus Suryadi AG, ed, Gramedia, Jakarta, 1987), Waves of Wonder (poetry, Heather Leah Huddleston, ed., International Library of Poetry, Maryland, USA, Juni, 2002), Secrets Need Words (poetry, Harry Aveling, ed., Ohio University, USA, 2001), The Poets Chant (poetry, Margaret Agusta, ed., The Istiqlal Festival, Jakarta, 1995), Ketika Kata Ketika Warna (poetry, Taufiq Ismail, ed. Yayasan Ananda, Jakarta, 1995), Puisi Indonesia 1997 (poetry, KSI-Angkasa, Bandung, 1997), Paradoks Kilas Balik (short stories, Sinar Harapan, Jakarta, 1998), Angkatan 2000 (poetry, Korrie Layun Rampan, ed, Gramedia, Jakarta, 2001), and Horison Kitab Puisi (poetry, Taufiq Ismail, ed., Horison-Ford Foundation, Jakarta, 2001), and have been read at Poetry of The Moon, Deutsche Welle, Germany (1999–2002).

Awards and Other Honors 
 MABIMS Award (ASEAN poetry contest, MABIMS, Brunei Darussalam, 1997)
 Iqra Award (national poetry contest, Iqra Foundation, Jakarta, Indonesia, 1992)
 Suara Merdeka Award (national short story contest, Semarang, Indonesia, 1992)
 Editor Choice Award (international poetry contest, The International Library of Poetry, USA, 2002).
 Sanggar Bambu Award (national short story contest, Jakarta, Indonesia, 1992)

References

1958 births
Living people
20th-century Indonesian poets
Indonesian journalists
Republika (Indonesian newspaper) people
21st-century Indonesian poets
Indonesian male poets
20th-century male writers
21st-century male writers